Lauritz Haccou (born 24 April 1994) is a Namibian cricketer. He made his List A debut for Namibia in the 2017–18 CSA Provincial One-Day Challenge on 11 February 2018. He is also an umpire, and stood in matches during the 2022 Capricorn Women's Tri-Series.

References

External links
 

1994 births
Living people
Namibian cricketers
Namibian cricket umpires
Place of birth missing (living people)